The Gaudi script (Gāuṛi lipi), also known as the Proto-Bengali script or the Proto-Oriya script is an abugida in the Brahmic family of scripts. Gaudi script gradually developed into the Bengali-Assamese (Eastern Nagari), Odia, and Tirhuta script.

Naming 
The Gaudi script is named after the Gauda Kingdom (Gāuṛ Rājya) of Gauḍa (region) in Eastern South Asia by the German scholar Georg Bühler. Medieval Gauḍa (region) is currently known as Bengal (region). Despite this name, the script was also used in Assam, Bihar, Odisha, Jharkhand, neighbouring parts of Nepal and Rakhine in Myanmar. The script is called by different names in different regions such as Proto-Assamese, Proto-Bengali, Proto-Maithili, Proto-Oriya. Which is why Sureshchandra Bhattacharyya suggests neutral names such as the abbreviated Proto-BAM, Proto-BAMO.

History
The Gaudi script appeared in ancient Eastern India as a northeastern derivative of the Siddham, derived from Gupta. According to the scholar Bühler, the Gaudi (or Proto-Bengali) script is characterized by its cursive letters and hooks or hollow triangles at the top of the verticals. In the 11th century, famous Persian scholar Al-Biruni wrote about the script. He mentioned amongst Indian alphabets, Gaudi is used in the purva desa (Eastern County).

The modern eastern scripts (Bengali-Assamese, Odia, and Maithili) became clearly differentiated around the 14th and 15th centuries from Gaudi. While the scripts in Bengal, Assam and Mithila remained similar to each other, the Odia script developed a curved top in the 13th-14th century and became increasingly different.

See also
 Gauda Kingdom
 Gauḍa (region)
 Brahmi script
 Brahmic scripts
 Siddhaṃ script
 Eastern Nagari

References

Brahmic scripts